JMulTi is an open-source interactive software for econometric analysis, specialised in univariate and multivariate time series analysis. It has a Java graphical user interface.

The motivation for its designed was to provide the means by which some time-series econometric procedures that were difficult or unavailable in other packages could be undertaken. Such procedures include Impulse Response Analysis with bootstrapped confidence intervals for VAR/VEC modelling.

See also

gretl
Comparison of statistical packages

References

External links
JMulTi Homepage
JMulTi on SourceForge

Free econometrics software
Time series software
Free software programmed in Java (programming language)